Christopher Daniel Pappas is a special advisor to the CEO of Trinseo S.A., a Berwyn-based global materials company that manufactures plastics, latex, and synthetic rubber, among others. Pappas previously served as the company's president and chief executive officer, beginning in June 2010 when the Dow Chemical Company sold a group of its businesses and assets to Bain Capital under the name Styron (later renamed Trinseo). Pappas retired from the position of CEO as of March 4, 2019.

Pappas is credited for his leadership in establishing the company's vision and culture,
and was awarded an ACS Leadership Award for Outstanding Corporate Reinvention in  2017.
He serves on a number of boards and was the 2017 chair of SCI America.

Education
Pappas earned a Bachelor of Science degree in civil engineering at Georgia Institute of Technology and a Master of Business Administration from the Wharton School of the University of Pennsylvania.

Career
Pappas entered the chemicals and plastics industry when he joined The Dow Chemical Company in 1978.
He became vice president of Ethylene Elastomers for DuPont Dow Elastomers LLC. in 1996 and commercial vice president in 1999.

In 2000 he joined Nova Chemicals Corporation, where he held positions including 
senior vice president and president of Styrenics (July 2000 – September 2006); 
president and chief operations officer (October 2006 – April 2009); and 
president and chief executive officer (May 2009 – November 2009).

In 2010, Pappas became president and chief executive officer when the Dow Chemical Company spun off a group of its businesses and assets as Styron (later Trinseo).  He also served on Trinseo's Executive Leadership Team and board of directors. Pappas retired as of March 4, 2019, being succeeded by Frank Bozich.

Pappas is a current member of the board of directors of 
FirstEnergy (2011-) (NYSE: FE) and 
Univar (2015-) (NYSE: UNVR), and a former board member of
Methanex (2004-?) 
Nova Chemicals, and 
Allegheny Energy (2008–2011).
As of 2017, Pappas was the chair of SCI America.

Since 2015, Pappas has served on the external advisor board of the School of Civil & Environmental Engineering at Georgia Tech. He and his wife Susan, both civil engineers from Georgia Tech, have established the Susan G. and Christopher D. Pappas Professorship in the School of Civil and Environmental Engineering.

Awards
 2018, voted top CEO among mid-cap publicly traded chemical companies in Institutional Investors yearly survey of top executives.
 2017, Leadership Award for Outstanding Corporate Reinvention, American Chemical Society’s New York Section, for the "visionary leadership needed to transform a collection of separate commodity businesses into a unified company with a clear strategy and vision".

References

American chief executives
Living people
Year of birth missing (living people)